Sarvanivāraṇaviṣkambhin is a bodhisattva revered in Mahāyāna Buddhism. He is one of the Eight Great Bodhisattvas with Mañjuśrī, Samantabhadra, Avalokiteśvara, Mahāsthāmaprāpta, Ākāśagarbha, Kṣitigarbha and Maitreya. His name means "He who blocks (viṣkambhin) all of the hindrances (sarva nivāraṇa)."

Role
He is invoked to remove or eliminate all the obstacles to insure a successful meditation.

Nivāraṇa
Although the eight Mahāsattvas belong to the current Mahāyāna, the term nivāraṇa is most commonly used in the Theravada texts where it refers to the five mental obstacles: desire (kamacchanda), hostility (vyapada), laziness (thinamiddha), distraction and worry (uddhachcha-kukuchcha), doubts (vichikicha) towards the Three Jewels. Sarvanivāraṇaviṣkambhi is best known to meditators and is not an important subject to individual worship like the other seven mahāsattvas.

In Vajrayāna
In Tantric Buddhism, he is usually placed in the lineage of Amoghasiddhi Buddha, one of the five Dhyani Buddhas, more rarely of Akshobhya Buddha. He is sometimes considered a form of Vajrapāṇi, though this is most likely a confusion with the mahāsattva Mahāsthāmāprāpta which Vajrapāṇi is one of its incarnations.

Iconography
In iconography, he has often a flower in one hand, sometimes with a jewel (Cintamaṇi).

Sutras concerned
He is mentioned in the Lotus Sutra, in which he pays homage to Avalokiteśvara, and in the Mahavairocana Tantra.
He is also the main interlocutor in Ratnamegha and Tathāgata-guṇa-jñānācintya-viṣayāvatāra-nirdeśa sutras.

Mantra
The mantra of this great bodhisattva to remove all obstacles and disturbances mentioned in the Vairocana-sūtra, is as follows:

namaḥ samantabuddhānāṃ/ aḥ/ sattva hitābhyudgata/ traṃ/ traṃ/ raṃ/ raṃ/ svāhā

Bibliography
Radha Banerjee: Ashtamahābodhisattva, the Eight Great Bodhisattvas in Art and Literature, Abha Prakashan,

Bodhisattvas